Rupes Kelvin is an escarpment near Promontorium Kelvin on the near side of the Moon, at . It is 86 km long. It takes its name from Promontorium Kelvin, which was named after the Irish scientist, physicist and engineer William Thomson, 1st Baron Kelvin.

References

External links

Rupes Kelvin at Moon Wiki
  - features the promontory

Escarpments on the Moon
William Thomson, 1st Baron Kelvin